The Fiancee is a 1980 East German drama film directed by Günter Reisch and Günther Rücker and based on a novel by Eva Lippold. The film is about the resistance of the communist Hella Lindau (Jutta Wachowiak) and her fiancé Hermann Reimers (Regimantas Adomaitis) against the Nazis.

The film won the Crystal Globe at the Karlovy Vary International Film Festival. It was also chosen as East Germany's official submission to the 53rd Academy Awards for Best Foreign Language Film, but did not manage to receive a nomination.

Cast
 Jutta Wachowiak as Hella Lindau
 Regimantas Adomaitis as Reimers
 Slávka Budínová as Lola
 Christine Gloger as Frenzel
 Inge Keller as Irene
 Käthe Reichel as Olser
 Hans-Joachim Hegewald as Hensch
 Barbara Zinn as Elsie
 Katrin Saß as Barbara
 Ewa Zietek as Hilde
 Ursula Braun as Naudorf

See also
 List of submissions to the 53rd Academy Awards for Best Foreign Language Film
 List of German submissions for the Academy Award for Best Foreign Language Film

References

External links

 The Fiancee at Filmportal.de
 The Fiancee on the DEFA-Stiftung web site 

1980 films
1980 drama films
German drama films
East German films
1980s German-language films
Films based on German novels
Films about the German Resistance
Crystal Globe winners
Films directed by Günter Reisch
1980s German films